Calliandra is a genus of flowering plants in the pea family, Fabaceae, in the mimosoid clade of the subfamily Caesalpinioideae. It contains about 140 species that are native to tropical and subtropical regions of the Americas.

Description
The flowers are produced in cylindrical or globose inflorescences and have numerous long slender stamens which give rise to the common names powder-puff, powder puff plant, and fairy duster. These plants flower all year round, but the best blooming is in spring and summer. They can be easily pruned.

Calliandra are often fed on by caterpillars, such as the larvae of statira sulphur (Aphrissa statira). It is available in many vibrant colours such as pink, white, etc.

Species
The following is an alphabetical listing of the 149 species in the genus Genus that are accepted by Plants of the World Online 

 Calliandra aeschynomenoides 
 Calliandra angustifolia 
 Calliandra antioquiae 
 Calliandra asplenioides 
 Calliandra bahiana 
 Calliandra belizensis 
 Calliandra bella 
 Calliandra biflora 
 Calliandra bifoliolata 
 Calliandra bijuga 
 Calliandra blanchetii 
 Calliandra bombycina 
 Calliandra brenesii 
 Calliandra brevicaulis 
 Calliandra bromelioides 
 Calliandra caeciliae 
 Calliandra californica 
 Calliandra calycina 
 Calliandra carcerea 
 Calliandra carrascana 
 Calliandra chilensis 
 Calliandra chulumania 
 Calliandra coccinea 
 Calliandra colimae 
 Calliandra comosa 
 Calliandra concinna 
 Calliandra conferta 
 Calliandra coriacea 
 Calliandra crassipes 
 Calliandra cruegeri 
 Calliandra cualensis 
 Calliandra × cumbucana 
 Calliandra debilis 
 Calliandra depauperata 
 Calliandra dolichopoda 
 Calliandra duckei 
 Calliandra dysantha 
 Calliandra elegans 
 Calliandra enervis 
 Calliandra eriophylla 
 Calliandra erubescens 
 Calliandra erythrocephala 
 Calliandra estebanensis 
 Calliandra falcata 
 Calliandra fasciculata 
 Calliandra feioana 
 Calliandra fernandesii 
 Calliandra foliolosa 
 Calliandra fuscipila 
 Calliandra ganevii 
 Calliandra gardneri 
 Calliandra geraisensis 
 Calliandra germana 
 Calliandra glaziovii 
 Calliandra glomerulata 
 Calliandra glyphoxylon 
 Calliandra goldmanii 
 Calliandra grandifolia 
 Calliandra guildingii 
 Calliandra haematocephala 
 Calliandra haematomma 
 Calliandra harrisii 
 Calliandra hintonii 
 Calliandra hirsuta 
 Calliandra hirsuticaulis 
 Calliandra hirtiflora 
 Calliandra houstoniana 
 Calliandra humilis 
 Calliandra hygrophila 
 Calliandra hymenaeoides 
 Calliandra iligna 
 Calliandra imbricata 
 Calliandra imperialis 
 Calliandra involuta 
 Calliandra iselyi 
 Calliandra jariensis 
 Calliandra juzepczukii 
 Calliandra laevis 
 Calliandra lanata 
 Calliandra laxa 
 Calliandra leptopoda 
 Calliandra lewisii 
 Calliandra linearis 
 Calliandra lintea 
 Calliandra longipedicellata 
 Calliandra longipes 
 Calliandra longipinna 
 Calliandra luetzelburgii 
 Calliandra macqueenii 
 Calliandra macrocalyx 
 Calliandra magdalenae 
 Calliandra mayana 
 Calliandra medellinensis 
 Calliandra molinae 
 Calliandra mollissima 
 Calliandra mucugeana 
 Calliandra nebulosa 
 Calliandra oroboensis 
 Calliandra paganuccii 
 Calliandra pakaraimensis 
 Calliandra palmeri 
 Calliandra paniculata 
 Calliandra parviflora 
 Calliandra parvifolia 
 Calliandra paterna 
 Calliandra pauciflora 
 Calliandra pedicellata 
 Calliandra peninsularis 
 Calliandra physocalyx 
 Calliandra pilgeriana 
 Calliandra pilocarpa 
 Calliandra pittieri 
 Calliandra pityophila 
 Calliandra purdiei 
 Calliandra purpurea 
 Calliandra quetzal 
 Calliandra renvoizeana 
 Calliandra rhodocephala 
 Calliandra ricoana 
 Calliandra rigida 
 Calliandra riparia 
 Calliandra rubescens 
 Calliandra samik 
 Calliandra santosiana 
 Calliandra seleri 
 Calliandra selloi 
 Calliandra semisepulta 
 Calliandra sesquipedalis 
 Calliandra sessilis 
 Calliandra silvicola 
 Calliandra sincorana 
 Calliandra spinosa 
 Calliandra squarrosa 
 Calliandra staminea 
 Calliandra stelligera 
 Calliandra subspicata 
 Calliandra surinamensis 
 Calliandra taxifolia 
 Calliandra tehuantepecensis 
 Calliandra tergemina 
 Calliandra tolimensis 
 Calliandra trinervia 
 Calliandra tsugoides 
 Calliandra tumbeziana 
 Calliandra tweediei 
 Calliandra ulei 
 Calliandra umbellifera 
 Calliandra vaupesiana 
 Calliandra virgata 
 Calliandra viscidula

Formerly placed here
Havardia pallens (Benth.) Britton & Rose (as C. pallens Benth.)
Viguieranthus alternans (Benth.) Villiers (as C. alternans Benth. and as C. thouarsiana Baill.)
Zapoteca caracasana (Jacq.) H.M.Hern. (as C. caracasana (Jacq.) Benth.)
Zapoteca formosa subsp. formosa (as C. formosa (Kunth) Benth. and C. marginata Griseb. ex R.O.Williams)
Zapoteca formosa subsp. schottii (Torr. & S.Watson) H.M.Hern. (as C. schottii Torr. & S.Watson)
Zapoteca portoricensis (Jacq.) H.M.Hern. (as C. portoricensis (Jacq.) Benth.)
Zapoteca tetragona (Willd.) H.M.Hern. (as C. tetragona (Willd.) Benth.)

Gallery

References

 
Taxa named by George Bentham
Fabaceae genera